Petalium longulum is a species of beetle in the family Ptinidae.

References

Further reading

 
 
 
 

Petalium
Beetles described in 1973